Stueng Saen Municipality is a municipality, also a district within Kampong Thom province, in central  Cambodia.  According to the 1998 census of Cambodia, it had a population of 66,014.

Etymology
Stueng Saen means "river of soldiers" in Khmer. Stueng means river in Khmer, while Saen is derived from the Sanskrit word Sena meaning "soldier".

Administration 
The following table shows the villages of Stueng Saen Municipality by commune.

References 

Districts of Kampong Thom province